Sirach Charles (born 31 October 1987), better known by his stage name Angel, is an English singer-songwriter, rapper and record producer from West London, England. His single "Go In, Go Hard", featuring vocals from English rapper Wretch 32, was released on 18 March 2012. The song reached number 41 on the UK Singles Chart. The following single, "Wonderful", performed better commercially, peaking at number nine on the UK Singles Cchart and topping the UK R&B Chart.

Music career

2010–11: Early career
Angel started off at the early age in a band with his brothers and sisters called the Charles Family. After playing at over 300 plus schools the band of siblings decided to go their own way. Angel (formerly known as Bud or Ching) released his first mixtape Patience is a Virtue in 2010. The mixtape included hits such as "Julie" and "Run This Redeye".

Angel co-wrote the Number 1 single Green Light by Roll Deep with his writing team Parallel which sold 400,000 copies in the UK. He co-wrote and featured on Wretch 32's album Black & White singing on "Never Be Me and I'm Not The Man" (also featuring Chipmunk). The album sold over 150,000 copies in the UK. He wrote and produced "Coming Home" for Pixie Lott and Jason Derulo.

During the time of 2011 Angel had released his much-anticipated mixtape 7 Minutes Before Time featuring the likes of Wiley, Maxsta, Giggs, Cleo Sol, Wretch 32, G Frsh, Scorcher, Sneakbo and Mark Asari. Videos were shot for the songs "Gleamin" featuring Wiley and Maxsta, "Popstar" featuring Giggs, "Ride Out" featuring Sneakbo, "Bottles" featuring G Frsh and Scorcher and lastly "Go in Go Hard" featuring Wretch 32, which was shot in early 2012.

2012–present: Mainstream success
In between time Angel had released another mixtape titled Any Minute Now which unlike 7 Minutes Before Time had one feature which was just "Are You Good" featuring Mark Asari of Encore. In this mixtape Angel covered many songs. He covered Rihanna's "Man Down" and Prince's "Most Beautiful Girl In The World". "Fire" was mixed from Lauryn Hill's "Zion" and "Tokin Grade" was Angel's interpretation of Frank Ocean's "Novacane".

On 18 March 2012 Angel released the single "Go In, Go Hard", which features vocals from Wretch 32. On 25 March 2012 the song entered the UK Singles Chart at number 41 and at number 14 on the UK R&B Chart.

On 15 July 2012 Angel released his second single entitled "Wonderful", it first charted on the UK Singles Chart at number twenty on the chart week ending 22 July it had sold 14,032 copies in its first week. Having remained at number twenty on its second charting week, the track advanced a single place to number nineteen for the week dated 11 August and a further seven places to number twelve the following week. On its sixth charting week dated 26 August "Wonderful" entered the top 10 at number nine. This became Angel's first Top 10 hit to enter the chart's in the United Kingdom as well as it becoming his first UK R&B Single's Chart number one respectively. On 12 November 2012, Angel performed at the 02 Academy in Brixton for the BBC Radio 1Xtra concert, along with acts such as Tulisa and Trey Songz.

Angel also featured on the official Children in Need single, "Wish I Belonged", alongside Fazer, Tyler James and Stooshe.

Angel released "Time After Time" on 2 December, composed by Theron Thomas, Timothy Thomas, Kassa Alexander, Sirach Charles (Angel), James Abrahart, Tommy Hittz. The song was listed on the BBC 1xtra A playlist on 6 December 2012. Meanwhile, an acoustic preview of '"Ride Or Die"' a duet sung by Angel and fellow rising artist Misha B was published on 21 November 2012 by SoulCultureMedia, and filmed by Darryl Daniel, Fabian Thomas and Versetti at the Artspace Studios in Brixton, South London. The duo performed a medley of their singles, with Angel giving us a rendition of Misha's Do You Think of Me and Misha taking on Angel's Time After Time, before the pair sing "Ride Or Die". 'Ride or Die'  featuring Misha B was officially released as the B-side to Angel's "Time After Time" on 6 December 2012. The track was composed by Sirach Charles (Angel), Kassa Alexander and Misha Amber Bryan. The official music video was directed by Paul Akinrinlola and Adam Deacon (who also stars), and produced by Parallel Pictures for Universal Music.

As a songwriter, Angel has written songs used by UK urban acts such as Roll Deep and Devlin, as well as composing pop pieces for the likes of JLS and Cheryl Cole.

2015–2016: Leyla, Hop on it & HER - EP 
From 2013 Angel sang his last single called About Rocket Love in the About Time Album. Then 2 years on Angel came back to sing his next single called Leyla (feat. Fuse ODG) which was released on 14 August 2015. His next single called Rude Boy (feat. Haile) from group WSTRN was released 4 March 2016. Rude Boy was later featured on Angel's EP entitled HER, released on 18 November 2016. This EP featured notable collaborations with contemporary R&B and Hip-hop artists on tracks Fvxk With You (2017) (feat. Rich Homie Quan) and Hop On (2017) (feat. Stefflon Don).

2017 till present: Singles Hi grade, Take You Home and future album: WOMAN 
In 2017, Angel has releases singles Crud & Road Closed. That same year, Hi-Grade (feat. Protoje), as well as its acoustic version Hi Grade (feat. Protoje)(Acoustic), were released featuring Reggae Artist Protoje. The end of 2017 has seen Angel release take on Eugene Wilde's 90's classic R&B track Gotta get you home in Take You Home (2017). The song includes samples of Foxxy Brown & Black Street's revisions of the old school jam and a bridge that of the likes of SWV's So into you.

2018 ALBUM: WOMAN, Pt.1 & 2 
After a long 1 1/2 years of waiting, Angel releases Album WOMAN. This album is a step up for Angel, putting in much hard work mixing all different classic R&B sounds with contemporary R&B, Trap and Hip-Hop sounds. This features appearances from WSTRN's Haile and GIGGS on highlight track 'Fly' bring a modern Trap-R&B vibe of the likes of contemporaries such as Bryson Tiller's and Eric Bellinger, who features with Angel for the second time on the song 'No FLutes', which is also the opening track of the album. The soulful, yet laid back hit "Thug Juice" gives a nod to 2Pac's smash "Thug Passion", providing a welcome trip down memory lane. The album was initially released in two parts, 1 and 2, but soon followed by the entire release featuring 14 tracks and later, Acoustic versions of R&B tracks 'Nothing Wrong', 'Risk it all' and 'Thug Juice'. 'Thug Juice' Has sonorities that remind drawn on the 90's R&B era with sounds reminiscing of popular artist of the time such as R.Kelly, H-Town or BlackStreet. WOMAN's first music video for the title 'Nothing wrong' makes references to R.Kelly tracks 'Honey Love' (1991) and 'Bump N' Grind' (1993).

Personal life

Angel grew up in Shepherd's Bush in West London, with his two brothers and two sisters. His father is Grenadian. Angel drew his main influence from his father, former manager and talented musician Tendai Charles, a professional keyboardist who accompanied an array of Reggae music talents including Kaya, Bob Marley and Dennis Brown.

His brother, Akelle Charles, found fame in summer 2015 with his track "In2" (featuring Haile and Louis Rei). The song racked up thousands of views and was signed to Atlantic Records, and the three artists released the song under the new stage name WSTRN.

Discography

Studio albums

Extended plays

Mixtapes

Singles

As lead artist

As featured artist

References

External links

1987 births
Living people
Singers from London
Black British male rappers
English male singers
British contemporary R&B singers
English male singer-songwriters
21st-century English singers
21st-century British male singers